Ramsey is a given name, and may refer to:
 Ramsey Campbell (born 1946), British writer of horror fiction
 Ramsey Clark (1927–2021), American lawyer and political activist; 66th United States Attorney General
 Ramsey Dukes, pen name of writer and magician Lionel Snell
 Ramsey Kanaan, Scottish anarchist and political activist now residing in the United States; founder of AK Press
 Ramsey Lewis (born 1935), American jazz musician and radio host

English masculine given names

de:Ramsey
fr:Ramsey
ru:Рэмси